York River can refer to:

Canada
York River (Ontario)
York River (Quebec)

United States
York River (Maine)
York River (Virginia)